Detention is a 2010 horror film starring Preston Jones and David Carradine.

Plot
A mismatched group of students at Reseda High School are sentenced to detention one stormy afternoon, and when their teacher vanishes and strange goings-on occur within the high school, they discover to their horror that ghosts have risen to avenge the brutal death of a student in the 1970s - a death for which their parents were responsible.

Cast

References

External links

2010 films
American supernatural horror films
2010 horror films
2010s English-language films
Films directed by James D. R. Hickox
2010s American films